Siphonochilus aethiopicus is a species of plant in the ginger family, Zingiberaceae. It was first described by Georg August Schweinfurth and received its current name from Brian Laurence Burtt.

References 

aethiopicus